was a major Japanese bank that served as the main bank for the Mitsubishi conglomerate/keiretsu. It merged with The Bank of Tokyo in 1996 to form The Bank of Tokyo-Mitsubishi (now MUFG Bank).

Mitsubishi acquired the business of the Tokyo, Oita and Hakodate-based 119th National Bank in 1885, and spun this business off to an independent Mitsubishi Bank in 1919. The bank opened branches in London and New York in 1920. During World War II, it was a financier of Japanese interests in Manchuria through its branch in Dalian, opened in 1933.

In 1948, the Mitsubishi conglomerate was dismantled and the bank was renamed  after the district of the same name in Tokyo. The bank reverted to the Mitsubishi name in 1953 and re-opened its London and New York offices. It became a major financier of the regrouped Mitsubishi keiretsu in the following years.

Mitsubishi and Dai-Ichi Bank, Japan's oldest bank, began preparations for a merger in 1969, which would have led to a major regrouping in the bank-led keiretsu system of the era. The plan met opposition among Dai-Ichi's management and its customers in the Furukawa and Kawasaki groups, who feared that Mitsubishi would dominate the combined bank and that their businesses would be absorbed by the relatively strong Mitsubishi group. As a result, the merger was called off. Two years later, Dai-Ichi merged with Nippon Kangyo Bank to form Dai-Ichi Kangyo Bank (now part of Mizuho Bank).

Mitsubishi was known as a very conservative lender and was one of the few Japanese banks to emerge from the Japanese asset price bubble relatively unscathed. It acquired the Nippon Trust Bank in 1994. In 1996, it combined with The Bank of Tokyo to form The Bank of Tokyo-Mitsubishi (now MUFG Bank).

In addition to its home country of Japan, Mitsubishi was also active in California, where it began banking operations in 1972 through Mitsubishi Bank of California. Mitsubishi acquired Bank of California in 1984, which later merged with Bank of Tokyo-controlled Union Bank to form what is now known as MUFG Union Bank.

Notable alumni
Zentaro Kosaka, politician and Japanese foreign minister
Makoto Usami, Bank of Japan president

References

Defunct banks of Japan
Mitsubishi companies
Mitsubishi UFJ Financial Group
Financial services companies based in Tokyo
Japanese companies established in 1919
Banks established in 1919
Banks disestablished in 1996
Companies formerly listed on the Tokyo Stock Exchange
Japanese companies disestablished in 1996
1996 mergers and acquisitions